This is a complete list of members of the United States Senate during the 99th United States Congress listed by seniority, from January 3, 1985, to January 3, 1987.

Order of service is based on the commencement of the senator's first term. Behind this is former service as a senator (only giving the senator seniority within his or her new incoming class), service as vice president, a House member, a cabinet secretary, or a governor of a state. The final factor is the population of the senator's state.

Senators who were sworn in during the two-year congressional term (up until the last senator who was not sworn in early after winning the November 1986 election) are listed at the end of the list with no number.

The most senior junior senator was Ernest Hollings of South Carolina. The most junior senior senator was Slade Gorton of Washington.

Terms of service

U.S. Senate seniority list

See also
99th United States Congress
List of members of the United States House of Representatives in the 99th Congress by seniority

Notes

External links
Senate Seniority List

099